Choqa Bala-ye Sofla (also Romanized as Choqā Bālā-ye Soflá) is a village in Parsinah Rural District, in the Central District of Sonqor County, Kermanshah Province, Iran. At the 2006 census, its population was 241, in 57 families.

References 

Populated places in Sonqor County